Blomstrandbreen is a glacier in Haakon VII Land at the western side of Spitsbergen, Svalbard. It has a length of 18 kilometres, extending from Isachsenfonna down to Kongsfjorden. The glacier is named after geologist Christian Wilhelm Blomstrand. To the northwest of the glacier is the mountain area of Mercantonfjellet.

References 

Glaciers of Spitsbergen